Anthi Karagianni is a Paralympian athlete from Greece competing mainly in category F13 long jump and in sprint events. She competed in the 2004 Summer Paralympics in Athens, Greece where she won silver medals in the T13 100m, T13 400m and F13 long jump. Karagianni also competed in the 2008 Summer Paralympics in Beijing, China. There she won a silver medal in the women's F13 long jump event and competed in the T13 100m and 200m events. In the 2012 Summer Paralympics she took the third place in F13 long jump, winning her fifth medal in the Paralympic Games. The Municipal Stadium "Anthi Karagianni" in her hometown of Kavala, Greece, was renamed in her honour in 2004.

External links
 

Paralympic athletes of Greece
Athletes (track and field) at the 2004 Summer Paralympics
Athletes (track and field) at the 2008 Summer Paralympics
Athletes (track and field) at the 2012 Summer Paralympics
Medalists at the 2004 Summer Paralympics
Medalists at the 2008 Summer Paralympics
Medalists at the 2012 Summer Paralympics
Paralympic silver medalists for Greece
Living people
Paralympic bronze medalists for Greece
Year of birth missing (living people)
Paralympic medalists in athletics (track and field)
Greek female sprinters
Greek female long jumpers
Visually impaired sprinters
Visually impaired long jumpers
Paralympic sprinters
Paralympic long jumpers
Sportspeople from Kavala
21st-century Greek women